Volker Kriegel (24 December 1943 – 15 June 2003) was a German jazz guitarist and composer who also an author and drew cartoons. He was a founding member of the United Jazz + Rock Ensemble.

Biography 

Kriegel was born in Darmstadt on 24 December 1943. He began to play the guitar at the age of 15.

Kriegel studied sociology with Theodor Adorno, but in 1962 was already playing in a band with Albert and Emil Mangelsdorff in Frankfurt, and abandoned his studies. He was then in a fusion band led by an American expatriate, vibraphonist Dave Pike, and recorded the album Noisy Silence – Gentle Noise (1969). Simultaneously, Kriegel started the Mild Maniac Orchestra. He recorded the album Keep on Driving (MPS, 1970) with Don "Sugarcane" Harris, then signed with MPS and released the jazz-rock album Spectrum (1971). Five years later he started the United Jazz + Rock Ensemble, a shifting collective which at various times included Charlie Mariano, Albert Mangelsdorff, Ack van Rooyen, and Barbara Thompson. In 1977 Kriegel co-founded the label Mood Records, which released his own music and that of the United Jazz + Rock Ensemble.

Kriegel drifted from music and started writing children's books. "During the 1990s, he ceased his activities as a leader and concentrated instead on working as a composer and on his longstanding second career as a cartoonist; his illustrations appeared in newspapers, magazines, books, and animated films." Manchmal ist es besser, man sagt gar nix, a book containing some of his cartoons and writings on jazz and other topics, was published in 1998. He reunited the Ensemble for a tour in 2002. He died of cancer in Spain on 15 June 2003.

Discography

As leader 
 With a Little Help from My Friends (Liberty, 1968) with Peter Trunk, Günter Lenz, Peter Baumeister, Claudio Szenkar
 Spectrum (MPS 1971, re-released 2003)
 Inside: Missing Link (MPS, 1972) with Albert Mangelsdorff, Alan Skidmore, Heinz Sauer, John Taylor, Eberhard Weber, John Marshall, Peter Baumeister, Cees See
 Lift! (MPS, 1973) with Zbigniew Seifert, Stan Sulzmann, Eberhard Weber, John Taylor, John Marshall
 Mild Maniac (MPS, 1974) with Rainer Brüninghaus, Eberhard Weber, Peter Giger, Joe Nay
 Topical Harvest (MPS, 1975) with Albert Mangelsdorff, Rainer Brüninghaus, Peter Giger, Joe Nay
 Octember Variations (MPS, 1976)
 Elastic Menu (MPS, 1977)
 Houseboat (MPS, 1978) with Wolfgang Schlüter
 Long Distance (MPS, 1979)
 Schöne Aussichten (Mood, 1983)
 Palazzo Blue (Mood, 1992)
 Journal (Mood, 1992)

With United Jazz + Rock Ensemble
 Live in Schützenhaus (Mood, 1977)
 Teamwork (Mood, 1978)
 The Break Even Point (Mood, 1979)
 Live in Berlin (Mood, 1981)
 United Live Opus Sechs (Mood, 1984)
 Round Seven (Mood, 1987)
 Na endlich! (Mood, 1992)
 Die neunte von United (Mood, 1996)

As sideman
With Klaus Doldinger
 Doldinger Goes On (1967)
 Doldinger Jubilee Concert, Passport (1974)

With Don "Sugarcane" Harris
 Keep on Driving (1970)
 Got the Blues (1972)
 New Violin Summit (1972)
 Keyzop (1975)
 Flashin' Time (1976)

With Dave Pike
 Noisy Silence – Gentle Noise (1969, MPS)
 Four Reasons (1969, MPS)
 Live at the Philharmonie (1969, MPS)
 Album (1971, MPS)
 Infra Red (1972, MPS)
 Salomao (1973, MPS)

With others
 Emil Mangelsdorff: Swinging Oil Drops (1966)
 Kühn Brothers & The Mad Rockers (1969)
 Jonny Teupen: Harpadelic (1969, MPS)
 Curt Cress Clan: CCC (1975)

Sources
 Carr, Ian; Fairweather, Digby; Priestley, Brian. Jazz: The Rough Guide, Penguin, 1995,

References

External links
 Official web site

1943 births
2003 deaths
20th-century guitarists
German jazz guitarists
Jazz fusion guitarists
Jazz-rock guitarists
German male guitarists
United Jazz + Rock Ensemble members
20th-century German male musicians
German male jazz musicians
20th-century German musicians